1945 Drexel Dragons football team was head coached by Maury McMains.

On Friday October 26, Drexel played in its program's first night football game against West Chester.

Schedule

Roster

References

Drexel
Drexel Dragons football seasons
Drexel Dragons football